Howmeh Rural District is in the Central District of Deylam County, Bushehr province, Iran. At the census of 2006, its population was 2,470 in 499 households; there were 2,507 inhabitants in 680 households at the following census of 2011; and in the most recent census of 2016, the population of the rural district was 2,395 in 680 households. The largest of its six villages was Ameri, with 1,558 people.

References 

Rural Districts of Bushehr Province
Populated places in Deylam County